The 2011 Premier League Season was the second division of British speedway. Glasgow Tigers won the league after winning both matches of a double-header on 9 October.

Pre Season

New Entries
The Leicester Lions were hoping to gain entry to the 2010 season. However, the track was not ready in time for them to compete. They therefore decided to return in 2011. With the stadium getting approval, the Lions were then confirmed as entrants for the 2011 season.

On 15 November 2011, Plymouth Devils boss Mike Bowden confirmed that the Devils hope to join the 2011 Premier League after spending 5 years in the National League. On 19 November, it was confirmed that the Stoke Potters were to withdraw from the 2011 Premier League season due to financial climate and making substantial losses over the last three season. However, it was confirmed that they would race in the 2011 National League. It was also decided at the Yearly AGM meeting that the Birmingham Brummies and the Ipswich Witches would exchange league memberships, meaning the Brummies would move up to the Elite League and the Witches would move down to the Premier League. On 27 November, the BSPA announced that the Coventry Bees and the Peterborough Panthers failed to declare their intention to race in the forthcoming Elite League season and are therefore seeking a league to compete in. Because of this, the Kings Lynn Stars elected to compete in the 2011 Elite League and therefore withdrew from the Premier League. Later that day, the Plymouth Devils announced that they were set to be accepted into the 2011 Premier League season

Season Format
At the Annual AGM Meeting, it was decided that the Premier League would be expanded to 19 home and 19 away fixtures throughout the season. The 14 teams will initially race each other in Round 1 with a total of 26 meetings (13 home and 13 away). In Round 2 the league then split into two groups of seven teams, with everyone then racing each other in their group for a further 12 meetings (6 home and 6 away). The format and cut-off point for the split is made as each team reaches 10 home and 10 away matches. Group 1 will be teams placed 1st, 4th, 5th, 8th, 9th, 12th and 14th - Group 2 is 2nd, 3rd, 6th, 7th, 10th, 11th and 13th. Those additional 12 matches are then added onto the points gained from the 26 meetings in Round 1. The league table above at the end of the season will then show a total of 38 meetings (19 home and 19 away). The team that finishes top after these 38 meetings is declared Premier League Champions.

The Premier League KOC has been retained for the 2011 season. A new competition, the Premier Shield has been introduced for the 2011 season. It is understood that it will work along the same lines as the Elite Shield, and contested by the previous seasons league winners and KOC champions. The 2011 Premier Shield will be contested between the Edinburgh Monarchs and the Newcastle Diamonds.

The Premier Trophy and the Young Shield do not continue into the 2011 season. It has yet to be confirmed if anything will replace these competitions.

Fixtures & Results
Phase 1

Phase 1 of the 2011 Premier League consists of each team racing each other, both at their home track and the oppositions away track. This would consist of 26 meetings for each team.

Last updated: August 2, 2011. Source: BSPA

Colours: Green = home win; Red = away win; White = draw

Home team listed in the left-hand column

Final League table (including Phase Two)

Home: 3W = Home win by 7 points or more; 2W = Home win by between 1 and 6 points
Away: 4W = Away win by 7 points or more; 3W = Away win by between 1 and 6 points; 1L = Away loss by 6 points or less
M = Meetings; D = Draws; L = Losses; F = Race points for; A = Race points against; +/- = Race points difference; Pts = Total Points

Last updated: June 22, 2011

Source: BSPA

Premier League Knockout Cup

Premier Shield

First leg

Second leg

Final leading averages

Riders & final averages
Berwick

Sebastian Aldén 8.41
Kozza Smith 8.40 
Josef Franc 8.19
Lee Complin 7.61
Linus Eklöf 7.47
Charlie Gjedde 7.06
Ludvig Lindgren 6.29
Hynek Stichauer 5.93
Jade Mudgway 4.74
Alex Edberg 4.00
Mitchell Davey 3.71
Tamas Sike 2.60

Edinburgh

Kevin Wölbert 8.82
Andrew Tully 8.14
Craig Cook 8.09
Matthew Wethers 8.00
Kalle Katajisto 6.11
Kyle Howarth 5.07
Byron Bekker 3.10
Lee Dicken 2.70
Ashley Morris 2.24
Tim Webster 2.15

Glasgow

Joe Screen 9.54 
Josh Grajczonek 8.74
James Grieves 8.12 
Nick Morris 8.06
Theo Pijper 6.84
Christian Henry 6.26
Michał Rajkowski 6.10
Richard Sweetman 5.95 
David Bellego 5.93

Ipswich

Lasse Bjerre 8.27
Kevin Doolan 8.06
Taylor Poole 7.66
Mathieu Trésarrieu 7.33
Morten Risager 7.01 
Chris Schramm 6.97
Chris Mills 6.68
Jerran Hart 4.98

Leicester

Magnus Karlsson 8.93
Kauko Nieminen 7.86
Richard Hall 7.50
Sergei Darkin 6.92
Richard Sweetman 6.83
Henning Bager 6.32
Ilya Bondarenko 5.45
Jan Graversen 5.32
Viktor Bergström 4.71
Charles Wright 4.64
Jason Garrity 4.43
John Oliver 4.26
Jamie Courtney 2.64

Newcastle

Stuart Robson 9.56
Mark Lemon 8.88
René Bach 7.35
Claes Nedermark 6.55
Derek Sneddon 6.53
Kyle Newman 5.49
Richie Worrall 4.50
Luboš Tomíček Jr. 4.00
Jason King 2.88
Joe Haines 2.81

Newport

Charlie Gjedde 10.25
Jason Doyle 8.73
Leigh Lanham 8.42
Kyle Legault 7.02
Kim Nilsson 6.75
Anders Mellgren 6.69
Robin Aspegren 6.61
Justin Sedgmen 6.32
Todd Kurtz 6.05
Mark Jones 4.22

Plymouth

Ben Barker 10.01
Ricky Wells 7.05
Jesper Kristiansen 6.24
Mark Simmonds 5.58
Jason Bunyan 5.33
Hynek Štichauer 4.70
Kyle Hughes 4.58
James Cockle 4.50
Guglielmo Franchetti 4.04
Lee Smart 3.52

Redcar

Jason Lyons 8.61
Aaron Summers 7.96
Matěj Kůs 7.52
Gary Havelock 7.08
Adam Roynon 6.08
Peter Juul 4.50
Luboš Tomíček Jr. 4.18
Robert Branford 3.30

Rye House

Chris Neath 9.13 
Jason Doyle 8.39
Jordan Frampton 8.04
Steve Boxall 6.34
Ritchie Hawkins 6.17
Luke Bowen 5.83
Tyson Nelson 5.78
James Brundle 4.26
Ben Morley 2.39

Scunthorpe

David Howe 8.53
Richard Hall 8.00
Tero Aarnio 7.17
Ben Wilson 6.57
Thomas Jorgensen 6.52
Viktor Bergström 6.19
Michael Palm Toft 6.08
Carl Wilkinson 5.43
Joe Haines 4.82
Steve Worrall 4.40

Sheffield

Shane Parker 9.43
Ricky Ashworth 8.89
Josh Auty 8.08
Emiliano Sanchez 6.67
Hugh Skidmore 6.61
Simon Lambert 6.51
Ashley Birks 4.49

Somerset

Sam Masters 8.33
Christian Hefenbrock 8.09
Dakota North 7.81
Cory Gathercole 7.37
James Wright 7.30
Travis McGowan 7.20
Alex Davies 6.49
Anders Mellgren 6.10
James Holder 5.06

Workington

Peter Kildemand 8.56
Richard Lawson 8.37 
Rusty Harrison 8.22
James Wright 8.14
Tomáš Topinka 7.29
Kenny Ingalls 6.48
Charles Wright 4.85
Gary Irving 4.69
Simon Nielsen 4.39

See also
List of United Kingdom Speedway League Champions
Knockout Cup (speedway)

References

Speedway Premier League
Premier
Speedway Premier League